Qingyuan County is a county in Lishui, in southwestern Zhejiang province, China, bordering Fujian province to the southeast, south, and west. Its county seat is located at Songyuan Town.

Administrative divisions
Towns:
Songyuan (松源镇), Huangtian (黄田镇), Zhukou (竹口镇), Pingdu (屏都镇), Hedi (荷地镇), Zuoxi (左溪镇), Xianliang (贤良镇)

Townships:
Lingtou Township (岭头乡), Wudabao Township (五大堡乡), Yushang Township (淤上乡), Annan Township (安南乡), Zhangcun Township (张村乡), Longgong Township (隆宫乡), Jushui Township (举水乡), Jianggen Township (江根乡), Hehu Township (合湖乡), Baishanzu Township (百山祖乡), Longxi Township (龙溪乡), Guantang Township (官塘乡), Sishan Township (四山乡)

Climate

References

External links
Official website of Qingyuan County

County-level divisions of Zhejiang
Lishui